Her Majesty's Inspector of Schools can refer to:

 Her Majesty's Inspectorate of Education, Scotland
 Her Majesty's Chief Inspector of Schools In England